The Best of The Guess Who Volume II is the fifth compilation album by the Canadian group The Guess Who. It was originally released by RCA Records in 1973, and contains recordings made between 1970 and 1973.

Release history

In addition to the usual 2 channel stereo version the album was also released by RCA in a 4 channel quadraphonic version on LP record and 8-track tape in 1974. The quad LP release used the Quadradisc system. 

In 1979, Pickwick Records reissued this album under license from RCA. This version omits the songs "Sour Suite" and "Guns, Guns, Guns". When RCA in Canada reissued this album on cassette in 1985, they used the Pickwick track listing.

The first CD issue was released in 1992 by RCA. In 2019, the album was reissued in the UK by Dutton Vocalion on the Super Audio CD format. The disc also contains the 1972 album Rockin'. The Dutton Vocalion release contains the complete stereo and quad versions of both albums.

The album peaked at number 186 on the Billboard 200 in January 1974.

Track listing

1979 Pickwick/Camden LP and 1985 RCA cassette track listing

Personnel
The Guess Who  
on tracks 1-7
Burton Cummings - lead vocals, keyboards
Kurt Winter - lead guitar
Greg Leskiw - rhythm guitar, backing vocals
Jim Kale - bass, backing vocals
Garry Peterson - drums, backing vocals

on track 8
Burton Cummings – lead vocals, keyboards
Kurt Winter – lead guitar
Donnie McDougall - rhythm guitar, backing vocals
Jim Kale - bass, backing vocals
Garry Peterson – drums

on tracks 9-11
Burton Cummings – lead vocals, keyboards
Kurt Winter – lead guitar
Donnie McDougall - rhythm guitar, backing vocals
Bill Wallace – bass, backing vocals
Garry Peterson – drums

Additional personnel
Jack Richardson - producer
Brian Christian - engineer and Quadraphonic remix

References

1973 compilation albums
The Guess Who albums
RCA Victor compilation albums